Sorghum leiocladum (also known as wild sorghum) is a grass plant in the family Poaceae that is found in eastern and northern Australia.

References

Further reading
Sorghum leiocladum. Florabank Fact Sheets 2011. Greening Australia.

leiocladum
Poales of Australia